James Bentley may refer to:

 James Bentley (Eureka Rebellion), Australian hotelier and owner of Bentley's Hotel, and prime suspect of the murder of James Scobie, which led to the Eureka Rebellion
 James Bentley (author) (1937–2000), English author
 James Bentley (actor) (born 1992), English actor
 James Bentley (rugby league) (born 1996), English rugby league player
 James L. Bentley (1927–2003), American politician; Comptroller General of Georgia
 Jim Bentley (born 1976), English footballer